That Mean Old Yesterday: A Memoir is a 2008 memoir by Stacey Patton.

The book was published by Simon & Schuster.

Overview
A coming-of-age memoir about a young African American woman surviving the foster care system to become an award-winning journalist.

References

External links 

Goodreads

2008 non-fiction books
American memoirs
Books about child abuse
Books about women
English-language books
African-American literature